A Duluth pack is traditional portage pack used in canoe travel, particularly in the Boundary Waters region of northern Minnesota and the Quetico Provincial Park  of Ontario.  A specialized type of backpack, Duluth packs are made of heavy canvas, leather, and/or cordura nylon, and are nearly square in order to fit easily in the bottom of a canoe.

Originally known as the "Poirier pack" or "Poirier pack-sack" (for its inventor, Camille Poirier), the pack style later became known as the "Duluth pack", as its primary manufacturing company of the same name is located in Duluth, Minnesota.

Description

A Duluth pack is a specialized type of backpack made of heavy canvas, leather, and/or cordura nylon. The packs are a traditional portage pack which are nearly square in order to fit easily in the bottom of a canoe. The simplest and most traditional Duluth pack consists of a single large envelope which is closed by straps and roller buckles. The pack is carried by two shoulder straps, and sometimes a tumpline worn over the top of the head.

Their key attributes make them well adapted to wilderness canoe camping where travel is largely by water (where the packs and gear do not need to be carried) punctuated by portages where the packs and gear need to be carried over land: 

They are generally larger than other packs, accommodating a larger quantity of gear. Canoe camping typically involves carrying more and heavier gear than, for example, backpacking.   
They must be built strong, carrying heavy loads even when exposure to the elements can weaken certain pack materials such as by saturation of leather. 
Their shape accommodates large volumes while remaining compact, and their design has few protuberances. This allows better fitting into canoes, less snagging during loading and unloading, less "catching" of the wind when traveling, and packing lower in canoes to lower the center of gravity to enhance canoe stability. 
They are not tall above the wearer's shoulders (such as backpacking packs typically are) allowing the wearer to also carry a canoe.  
Some have a tumpline which assists weight distribution with heavy loads.   

Conversely, they lack many features and attributes of long distance backpacking type backpacks, and so are generally not used for such.

History 
The Duluth pack has its roots in a French-Canadian named Camille Poirier, who made his way west to Duluth, Minnesota. Arriving in 1870 with his "little stock of leather and tools," he began a small shoe store and quickly made a go of it in this booming frontier town on the shores of Lake Superior. Out of his small shoe shop on the waterfront in Duluth, Camille began building a new style canoe pack with a tumpline, sternum strap, and umbrella holder. The patented the "C. Poirier Pack Sack" strap design in 1882. In 1911, Poirier sold his business to Duluth Tent & Awning Company, which later became the company Duluth Pack.

References

External links

Luggage
Bags
Bags (fashion)
Camping equipment
Hiking equipment